Moccasin is an unincorporated community and census-designated place in Mohave County, Arizona, United States. It is within the Kaibab Indian Reservation, and its population was 53 as of the 2020 census, down from 89 at the 2010 census. It is bordered to the south by the CDP of Kaibab.

Some say the community was named from a single moccasin found near the original town site, while others believe a moccasin-shaped rock formation caused the name to be selected.

References

Census-designated places in Mohave County, Arizona